Charles Miner may refer to:
Charles Miner (1780–1865), American politician
Charles Abbott Miner (1830–1903), American politician
Charles W. Miner (1866–1912), American photographer
Charles Miner, a fictional character in the American television series The Office